Santarém may refer to:

Places
 Santarém, Pará, Brazil
 Santarém District, a district in Portugal
 Santarém, Portugal, the seat of the above district
 Roman Catholic Diocese of Santarém, Portugal

Other
 Santarém cheese, a Portuguese goat cheese
 Santarém, an alternative name for the Portuguese wine grape Periquita
 João de Santarém, a 15th-century Portuguese explorer